Canadian rapper Killy has released four studio albums, one extended play and a number of singles. This is in addition to the music he has "unofficially" released on his Soundcloud.

Albums

Studio albums

Extended plays

Singles

As lead artist

As featured artist

Other certified songs

Guest appearances

References

Discographies of Canadian artists
Hip hop discographies